MBC every1 is a South Korean pay television network, specialising in entertainment-related variety programming. It is a subsidiary of MBC Plus.

History
MBC every1 started in October 15, 2007 to air dramas and variety shows and replace the channel MBC MOVIES. 

DMB service started from 2008.

Programs
These are MBC every1's currently airing programs:

TV series
 Please Don't Date Him

Variety Show
 Weekly Idol
 Idol Show
 Star Show 360
 Video Star
 Showtime

Special programming
Melon Music Awards (2010–2017, simulcast on MBC Music)

References

External links
 Official Website 

Munhwa Broadcasting Corporation television networks
Television channels in South Korea
Korean-language television stations
Television channels and stations established in 2003